The Queen Alexandra Military Hospital (QAMH) opened in July 1905. It was constructed immediately to the north of the Tate Britain (across a side-street) adjacent to the River Thames on the borders of the neighbourhoods of Millbank and Pimlico, Westminster, London.  The hospital closed in 1977, but several buildings remain.

History

The hospital was officially opened by King Edward VII and his wife Queen Alexandra, who was the president of the Queen Alexandra's Royal Army Nursing Corps, in July 1905.

In 1907 the Royal Army Medical College opened on the south side of the Tate Gallery.

In the First World War it became a general hospital for the British Army. Apart from the war-wounded by munitions, it attended to cases of trench fever, frostbite, shellshock and gas gangrene. After the war it was enlarged to 200 beds and, together with the Royal Army Medical College, became the postgraduate school for medical officers of the Royal Army Medical Corps and British overseas territories as well as the Royal Navy and Royal Air Force. It was the only British institution teaching military surgery.

There were strong ties with Westminster Hospital due to its then proximity (based in Broad Sanctuary and from 1939 in Horseferry Road) and also the Army Medical Service, and there was a joint neoplastic clinic.

In the Second World War the hospital together with its college formed a large site vulnerable to bombing but only received superficial damage. After the war a vascular surgical unit was set up with St Mary's Hospital, Paddington and postgraduate training continued for Army medical officers in surgery, tropical diseases and pathology (for assistance in prevention and diagnosis), while other ranks received more technical medical training.

In 1957 the hospital was extended to 300 beds with two operating theatres and 11 wards including one for children. Male nurses were from the Royal Army Medical Corps and female nurses from the Queen Alexandra's Royal Army Nursing Corps.

After services had transferred to the Queen Elizabeth Military Hospital in Woolwich, the hospital closed in 1977. The Royal Army Medical College remained at Millbank until teaching transferred to the Queen Alexandra Hospital in Cosham near Portsmouth in 2005.

In 2005 Westminster City Council produced an 'conservation audit' of the wider Millbank conservation area. The report described the hospital building as follows: 

Part of the hospital site has since be used for an extension of the Tate but most of the buildings remain. These have housed various administration departments of the Tate as well as the library, meeting rooms and the conservation science section. The chapel remains but its stained glass window, depicting the Ascension of Jesus Christ, was carefully removed to the Queen Elizabeth Military Hospital, Woolwich. The area around the Tate, including the former military hospital, the former Royal Army Medical College and other adjacent areas is a conservation area, although as at 2005 only the hospital buildings were not listed.

See also
 Henry MacCormac (dermatologist)
 Timeline of Imperial College School of Medicine

References

Hospital buildings completed in 1905
Military-related organizations
Military history of London
Military hospitals in the United Kingdom
Defunct hospitals in London
Art gallery districts
1905 establishments in England